Riva is a census-designated place (CDP) in Anne Arundel County, Maryland, United States. The population was 4,076 at the 2010 census. The area is scenic, especially where the two-lane Riva Road crosses the South River on a bridge. The area is growing with large new homes as the suburbs of Annapolis grow outward. Riva is bordered by Annapolis  to the north, Edgewater to the east, and Davidsonville to the west.

Currently Riva is served by Central Elementary School, Davidsonville Elementary School, Central Middle School, and South River High School in Edgewater, Maryland.

History
Aisquith Farm E Archeological Site was listed on the National Register of Historic Places in 1991.

There have been several large developments made in Riva over the years.

Sylvan Shores

Riva Farms

Berkshire 1978 - 1981

Annapolis Landing 1979 -

Geography
Riva is located at  (38.952079, −76.582135).

Demographics

As of the census of 2000, there were 3,966 people, 1,423 households, and 1,169 families residing in the CDP. The racial makeup of the CDP was 94.23% White, 3.43% African American, 1.21% Asian, 0.15% from other races, and 0.98% from two or more races. Hispanic or Latino of any race were 2.12% of the population.

There were 1,423 households, out of which 37.6% had children under the age of 18 living with them, 72.1% were married couples living together, 6.3% had a female householder with no husband present, and 17.8% were non-families. 13.6% of all households were made up of individuals, and 4.1% had someone living alone who was 65 years of age or older. The average household size was 2.79 and the average family size was 3.07.

In the CDP, the population was spread out, with 26.1% under the age of 18, 5.1% from 18 to 24, 28.8% from 25 to 44, 32.0% from 45 to 64, and 7.9% who were 65 years of age or older. The median age was 39 years. For every 100 females, there were 102.1 males. For every 100 females age 18 and over, there were 98.3 males.

The median income for a household in the CDP was $88,287, and the median income for a family was $95,457. Males had a median income of $54,750 versus $36,122 for females. The per capita income for the CDP was $41,975. About 1.1% of families and 0.9% of the population were below the poverty line, including 1.2% of those under age 18 and 1.5% of those age 65 or over.

Notable people
Peter Bondra, former NHL player, former general manager of the Slovakia men's national ice hockey team

References

Mike's Crab House, Riva MD
Riva Gardens, Riva MD

Census-designated places in Maryland
Census-designated places in Anne Arundel County, Maryland
Maryland populated places on the Chesapeake Bay